1895 ballet premieres, List of
Lists of ballet premieres by year
Lists of 1890s ballet premieres